Fan Weitang (18 July 1935 – 1 January 2023) was a Chinese engineer and politician who served as vice minister of coal industry from 1993 to 1995, and an academician of the Chinese Academy of Engineering.

Fan was a member of the 8th and 9th National Committees of the Chinese People's Political Consultative Conference.

Biography
Fan was born in Beijing, on 18 July 1935, while his ancestral home is in Ezhou, Hubei. His father Fan Zhilun was a water conservancy educator, and his younger brother  is also a member of the Chinese Academy of Engineering. After graduating from the Mining Department of Beijing Iron and Steel University (now University of Science and Technology Beijing) in 1956, he went to study at Beijing University of Foreign Languages and Beijing Institute of Mining (now China University of Mining and Technology). In 1959, he did his postgraduate work at Moscow Institute of Mining in the Soviet Union.

Fan returned to China in 1963 and became a member of the China Coal Research Institute.

On 1 January 2023, Fan died from COVID-19 in Beijing, at the age of 87.

Honours and awards
 1994 Member of the Chinese Academy of Engineering (CAE)
 2002 Foreign Member of the Royal Swedish Academy of Engineering Sciences (IVA)

References

1935 births
2023 deaths
Engineers from Beijing
University of Science and Technology Beijing alumni
Members of the Chinese Academy of Engineering
Members of the 8th Chinese People's Political Consultative Conference
Members of the 9th Chinese People's Political Consultative Conference
People's Republic of China politicians from Beijing
Chinese Communist Party politicians from Beijing
Members of the Royal Swedish Academy of Engineering Sciences
Deaths from the COVID-19 pandemic in China
20th-century Chinese engineers
21st-century Chinese engineers